The Güines Formation is a geologic formation in Cuba. It preserves fossils dating back to the Early to Middle Miocene period. Among others, fossils of the prehistoric dugong, Metaxytherium were found in the formation.

Fossil content 
 Aturia cubaensis
 Metaxytherium riveroi

See also 

 List of fossiliferous stratigraphic units in Cuba

References

Further reading 
 
 A. K. Miller and H. R. Downs. 1950. Tertiary nautiloids of the Americas: supplement. Journal of Paleontology 24:1-18
 L. S. Varona. 1972. Un Dugongido del Mioceno de Cuba (Mammalia: Sirenia). Sociedad de Ciencias Naturales La Salle: Caracas, Venezuela Memoria 91(32):5-19

Geologic formations of Cuba
Neogene Cuba
Paleontology in Cuba
Limestone formations
Formations